AZF may refer to:
 AZF (factory) (French initialism for AZote Fertilisant, i.e. nitrogen fertiliser)
 AZF (terrorist group) believed to have taken its name from an explosion at the AZf factory in Toulouse 
 Azoospermia factor